China Northwest Airlines Flight 2303 was a domestic flight from Xi'an to Guangzhou, People's Republic of China. On June 6, 1994, the aircraft operating the flight, a Tupolev Tu-154M, broke up in-flight and crashed as a result of an autopilot malfunction which caused violent shaking and overstressed the airframe. All 160 people on board were killed. As of 2023, it remains the deadliest airplane crash ever in mainland China.

Aircraft 
The aircraft was a Tupolev Tu-154M (registration B-2610, factory 86A740, serial no. 0740). It was completed by the Kuibyshev Aviation Plant (KuAPO) on December 22, 1986, and was immediately transferred to the Civil Aviation Administration of China (CAAC). On July 1, 1988, due to reorganization, CAAC transferred the aircraft to China Northwest Airlines. The aircraft was powered with three Soloviev D-30KU-154-II low-bypass turbofan engines from the Rybinsk Engine Plant. On the day of the accident, the aircraft had 12,507 flying hours and 6,651 takeoff and landing cycles.

Passengers and crew

Crew 
The flight crew consisted of captain Li Gangqiang, instructor captain Xin Tiancai, first officer Yang Min, navigator Zhang Nanjing, and flight engineer Kang Youfa. There were also nine flight attendants on board.

Passengers

Accident 
The aircraft took off from Xi'an Xianyang International Airport at 8:13 on June 6, 1994. At the time, it was raining, but this did not cause a delay in departure.

Three minutes after take-off, the plane flew over Xi'an City and turned southeast. The crew then reported an unstable pitch-up to 20° and 30° at 8:16:24 and 8:16:58, respectively.

At 8:17:06, while over Mingdu Township, Chang'an County, Shaanxi, the aircraft became unable to maintain its assigned attitude. The crew then temporarily engaged the autopilot, which unexpectedly caused the aircraft to turn right.

At 8:22:42, the aircraft disintegrated in mid-air above the suburb of Tsuitou Village, Mingyu Township. All 146 passengers and 14 crew died, most on impact.

Investigation 
Poor maintenance was the probable cause of the accident. The previous evening, the autopilot yaw-channel had been erroneously connected to the bank control, and the bank-channel to the yaw controls, while undergoing maintenance at an unapproved facility.

Aftermath 
This crash, as well as the crash of China Southwest Airlines Flight 4509 in 1999, resulted in China's decision to retire the Tupolev Tu-154. All Tu-154s in China were removed from service on October 30, 2002. In 2003, China Northwest airlines merged into China Eastern Airlines. Flight 2303 is still in use by China Eastern Airlines for their Xian-Guangzhou flight.

See also 

 Air Astana Flight 1388

References 

June 1994 events in Asia
1994 disasters in China
Aviation accidents and incidents in 1994
Aviation accidents and incidents in China
Accidents and incidents involving the Tupolev Tu-154
Airliner accidents and incidents caused by maintenance errors
Airliner accidents and incidents caused by design or manufacturing errors